Uppukandam Brothers is a 1993 Indian Malayalam-language action film directed by T. S. Suresh Babu and written by Kaloor Dennis from a story by Thommichan Neendoor. The film stars Captain Raju, Mohan Raj, Babu Antony, Jagadish, Baiju Santhosh, Geetha, Maathu, Siddique, Rajan P. Dev, Prathapachandran, and Jagathy Sreekumar. The film gave a breakthrough for Babu Antony's career. The background score for this film was composed by S. P. Venkatesh. A sequel, Uppukandam Brothers: Back in Action was released on 2011.

Plot

Cast 
 Captain Raju as Uppukandam Kariachan
 Mohan Raj as Uppukandam Paulachan
 Babu Antony as Uppukandam Sevichan
 Jagadish as Uppukandam Josekutty
 Baiju as Uppukandam Thankachan
 Siddique as SP Roy Mathews
 Geetha as Alice, Roy's wife
 Sukumaran as Uppukandam Kora
 Maathu as Leena Chandy, Josekutty's wife 
 Jagathy Sreekumar as Kunjeesho
 Sonia as Annie, Thankachan's love interest 
 Kalpana as Elamma Kariachan
 Philomina as Meenkari Kunjannamma
 Rajan P. Dev as Ettuveettil Ananthan Pillai
 Bheeman Raghu as Ettuveettil Pankajakshan
 Kundara Johny as Ettuveettil Vasu
 Rizabawa as Vasu's Son
 Raveendran as Vasu's Son
 Mahesh as Ettuveettil Sunil
 Prathapachandran as Chandikunju
 Zainuddin as Keshu Nair
 Vijayakumar as James Chacko
 N. F. Varghese as Chacko
 Kanakalatha as Annamma Chandy
 Thesni Khan Jessy Chacko
 Kalady Omana as Chacko's wife
 Thodupuzha Vasanthi as Ananthan Pillai's wife
 Ponnamma Babu as Pankajakshan's wife
Sabnam as Vasu's Son's Wife 
Ajith Kollam as Ananthan Pillai's brother

References

External links
 
 Srikanth debuts in Malayalam 

1993 films
1990s Malayalam-language films
Uppukandam1
Films directed by T. S. Suresh Babu